The 1985–86 Ice hockey Bundesliga season was the 28th season of the Ice hockey Bundesliga, the top level of ice hockey in Germany. 10 teams participated in the league, and Kolner EC won the championship.

First round

Relegation round

Playoffs

Quarterfinals

Semifinals

3rd place

Final

References

External links
Season on hockeyarchives.info

Eishockey-Bundesliga seasons
Ger
Bundesliga